XHPT-FM is a radio station on 91.3 FM in Córdoba, Veracruz, Mexico.  It is owned by Grupo Radio Digital and operated by Radio Comunicaciones de las Altas Montañas and carries the Exa FM pop format from MVS Radio.

History
XHPT received its concession on January 23, 1973. It was owned by Carlos Julio Suastegui Fentanes and broadcast with 3 kW until 2012.

References

Radio stations in Veracruz
Radio stations established in 1973